Todd Woodbridge and Mark Woodforde were the defending champions, but lost in the first round this year.

Jim Grabb and Richey Reneberg won the title, defeating Marcos Ondruska and Brad Pearce 6–7, 6–3, 6–0 in the final.

Seeds

  Jim Grabb /  Richey Reneberg (champions)
  Todd Woodbridge /  Mark Woodforde (first round)
  Patrick McEnroe /  Jared Palmer (semifinals)
  Jacco Eltingh /  Paul Haarhuis (semifinals)

Draw

Draw

References

External links
 Draw

U.S. Pro Indoor
1993 ATP Tour